Anniston Regional Airport , formerly known as Anniston Metropolitan Airport, is a city-owned public-use airport located five nautical miles (6 mi, 9 km) southwest of the central business district of Anniston, a city in Calhoun County, Alabama, United States. It is included in the National Plan of Integrated Airport Systems for 2011–2015, which categorized it as a general aviation airport.

Facilities and aircraft 
Anniston Regional Airport covers an area of 596 acres (241 ha) at an elevation of 612 feet (187 m) above mean sea level. It has one runway designated 5/23 with an asphalt surface measuring 7,000 by 150 feet (2,134 x 46 m).

For the 12-month period ending April 30, 2012, the airport had 33,644 aircraft operations, an average of 92 per day: 71% general aviation, 15% military, 14% air taxi, and <1% scheduled commercial. At that time there were 32 aircraft based at this airport: 50% single-engine, 31% multi-engine, 6% jet, 6% glider, and 6% ultralight.

Incidents 

References

External links 
 Anniston Regional Airport at City of Anniston website
 Anniston Aviation, the fixed-base operator (FBO)
 Aerial image as of March 1998 from USGS The National Map
 
 

Airports in Alabama
Anniston, Alabama
Transportation buildings and structures in Calhoun County, Alabama
Former Essential Air Service airports